Phoenix Mountain, also known by its Chinese name Fenghuangshan, is a mountain located on the edge of West Lake in Hangzhou, the capital of Zhejiang province in eastern China.  It is connected with a string of hills called Wushan and is the highest point within the city.

According to Chinese legend, the mountain is the earthly remains of a mythical golden phoenix who, along with a jade dragon, had created a beautiful pearl which was subsequently stolen from them by the henchman of a queen goddess.  In their attempt to rescue the pearl from the jealous queen, the pair cause the pearl to drop from heaven and turn into West Lake.  The phoenix and dragon decide to remain beside it forever by becoming mountains.

It is also the site of the imperial palace of the Southern Song dynasty, lie at the foot of the mountain in Shangcheng district of Hangzhou. The palace is destroyed in 1276, eleven years after the fall of the dynasty.

See also
 Other Phoenix Mountains

References

Mountains of Zhejiang